Javier Frana was the defending champion but lost in the first round to Marc-Kevin Goellner.

Jan Siemerink won in the final 6–3, 7–6(7–0) against Sandon Stolle.

Seeds

  Cédric Pioline (first round)
  Albert Costa (first round)
  MaliVai Washington (first round)
  Mark Woodforde (first round)
  Jan Siemerink (champion)
  Todd Woodbridge (semifinals)
  Jason Stoltenberg (first round)
  Àlex Corretja (second round)

Draw

Finals

Top half

Bottom half

References
 1996 Manchester Open Singles draw

Nottingham Open
Nottingham Open - Singles
1996 Nottingham Open